Heidar Missile is an Iranian air-to-ground missile which was unveiled on April 25, 2019 while it was installed on a Cobra helicopter. The maximum range of the missile is 12 kilometre.

"Heidar missile" is considered as a precise air-to-ground missile designed/made by Ministry of Defense and Armed Forces Logistics (Iran) and Islamic Republic of Iran Army Aviation. This missile is capable to be utilized against armored and ground-based targets, which are including enemy gatherings. This can pierce its target as deep as 1 meter and be fitted with diverse seeker systems, that would enable its deployment in various weather conditions.

See also 
 List of military equipment manufactured in Iran
 Shafaq
 Bina (missile)

References

Islamic Republic of Iran Army
Guided missiles of Iran